The 1998 United States Senate election in Louisiana was held November 3, 1998. Incumbent Democratic U.S. Senator John Breaux won re-election to a third term. , this is the last time that the Democrats have won the Class 3 Senate seat from Louisiana.

Major candidates

Democratic 
 John Breaux, incumbent U.S. Senator

Republican 
 Jim Donelon, State Representative

Results

See also 
 1998 United States Senate elections

United States Senate
Louisiana
1998